Colin William Brooks (born 9 January 1970) is an Australian politician. He has been a Labor Party member of the Victorian Legislative Assembly since 2006, representing the electorate of Bundoora. He is currently the Minister for Child Protection and Family Services and Minister for Disability, Ageing and Carers since June 2022, having previously served as the Speaker of the Victorian Legislative Assembly from March 2017 until his ministerial appointment.

Early life
Born in Sydney, he was educated at De La Salle College in Ashfield before receiving an electrical trades certificate from Petersham TAFE. He was an electrician from 1990 to 1996.

Political career
In 1996, Brooks became an electorate officer.  From 1997 to 2005, he served on Banyule City Council, being mayor from 1998 to 1999 and 2001 to 2002. In 2006, he was selected as the Labor candidate for the safe seat of Bundoora in the 2006 state election, after the retirement of sitting member Sherryl Garbutt. He has represented the seat since.  In March 2017, he was chosen by the Labor Caucus to replace Telmo Languiller as Speaker of the Legislative Assembly. He was re-elected as Speaker in December 2018.

Brooks was appointed as Minister for Child Protection and Family Services and Minister for Disability, Ageing and Carers in the Second Andrews Ministry in June 2022.

Brooks is a member of the Australian Workers Union component of the Victorian Labor Right.

Personal life
Brooks is married with three children. He takes an interest in fishing and gardening. In 2001, he received the Centenary Medal.

References

External links
 Parliamentary voting record of Colin Brooks at Victorian Parliament Tracker

1970 births
Living people
Australian Labor Party members of the Parliament of Victoria
Members of the Victorian Legislative Assembly
Speakers of the Victorian Legislative Assembly
Mayors of places in Victoria (Australia)
Recipients of the Centenary Medal
Australian electricians
21st-century Australian politicians
Politicians from Sydney
Labor Right politicians